Túcume is a pre-Hispanic site in Peru, south of the La Leche River on a plain around La Raya Mountain. The area is referred to as Purgatorio (purgatory) by local people.

The site was a major regional center, maybe even the capital of the successive occupations of the area by the Lambayeque/Sican (800-1350 AD), Chimú (1350–1450 AD) and Inca (1450–1532 AD). Local shaman healers (curanderos) invoke power of Tucume and La Raya Mountain in their rituals, and local people fear these sites.

The vast plains of Túcume are part of the Lambayeque region, the largest valley of the north coast of Peru. The Lambayeque Valley is the site of scores of natural and man-made waterways and is also a region containing the remains of about 250 decaying and heavily eroded mud-brick pyramids.

See also
 Iperu, tourist information and assistance
 Tourism in Peru

References

External links 

 Túcume Archaeological Site

Pyramids in Peru
Archaeological sites in Lambayeque Region
Archaeological sites in Peru
Tourist attractions in Lambayeque Region